Tills may refer to:

Robert Tills, the first American naval officer killed during the Battle of the Philippines.
USS Tills (DE-748), a Cannon-class destroyer escort named after Robert Tills.

See also
Till (disambiguation)